Coming of Age is a widely noticed 1999 photographic art book by photographer Will McBride.

It contains a picture of a naked teenage male taken in the commune's kitchen in Oberpfaffenhofen, 1973. 

The book primarily contains pictures of males in their teens. Some of the pictures are nude pictures.

Sources, references and endnotes

1999 non-fiction books
Books of photographs
Books of nude photography
American non-fiction books